The England women's cricket team toured Australia and New Zealand from January to March 1949, playing three Test matches against Australia, followed by one against New Zealand. The series against Australia was retrospectively recognised as the third series of the Women's Ashes; England entered the series as notional holders of the Ashes, having won the first series in 1934–35, and retained them by drawing the second series, in 1937. Australia claimed their first series victory over England in 1949, winning 1–0, with two drawn matches.

Australia Test series

1st Test

2nd Test

3rd Test

New Zealand Test series

Test Match

References

Further reading

 
 
 

The Women's Ashes
1949 in Australian cricket
1949 in English cricket
1949 in New Zealand cricket
1949 in women's cricket
January 1949 sports events in Australia
February 1949 sports events in Australia
March 1949 sports events in Australia
January 1949 sports events in New Zealand
February 1949 sports events in New Zealand
March 1949 sports events in New Zealand
Australia New Zealand 1949
International cricket competitions from 1945–46 to 1960
England 1949
England 1949